Amgen Inc. (formerly Applied Molecular Genetics Inc.) is an American multinational biopharmaceutical company headquartered in Thousand Oaks, California. One of the world's largest independent biotechnology companies, Amgen was established in Thousand Oaks, California, in 1980. Amgen's Thousand Oaks staff in 2017 numbered 5,125 (7.5% of total city employment) and included hundreds of scientists, making Amgen the largest employer in Ventura County. Focused on molecular biology and biochemistry, its goal is to provide a healthcare business based on recombinant DNA technology.

In 2018, the company's largest selling product lines were Neulasta, an immunostimulator used to prevent infections in patients undergoing cancer chemotherapy and Enbrel, a tumor necrosis factor blocker used in the treatment of rheumatoid arthritis and other autoimmune diseases. Other products include Epogen, Aranesp, Sensipar/Mimpara, Nplate, Vectibix, Prolia and XGEVA. Amgen sponsored the Tour of California from 2011 to 2017.

History 

The word AMGen is a portmanteau of the company's original name, Applied Molecular Genetics, which became the official name of the company in 1983 (three years after incorporation and coincident with its initial public offering). The company's first chief executive officer, from 1980, was co-founder George B. Rathmann, followed by Gordon M. Binder in 1988, followed by Kevin W. Sharer in 2000. Robert A. Bradway became Amgen’s president and chief executive officer in May 2012 following Sharer's retirement.

The company has made at least five major corporate acquisitions.

Timeline
1980. William Bowes from Cetus Corporation recruits Winston Salser from UCLA to start Amgen with a scientific advisory board consisting of Norman Davidson, Leroy Hood, Arnold Berk, John Carbon, Robert Schimke, Arno Motulsky, Marvin H. Caruthers, and Dave Gibson.
1989. Amgen received approval for the first recombinant human erythropoetin product, Epogen, for the treatment of anemia associated with chronic kidney failure. Epogen (also marketed by Johnson and Johnson under the tradename Procrit) would later be approved for anemia due to cancer chemotherapy, anemia due to treatment with certain HIV drugs, and for the reduction of the need for transfusions associated with surgery.
 1991. In February 1991, Amgen received FDA approval for Neupogen for the prevention of infections in patients whose immune systems are suppressed due to cancer chemotherapy. A 2002 meta-analysis found that Neupogen treatment reduced the risk of febrile neutropenia by 38%, reduced the risk of documented infection by 49%, and reduced the risk of infection-related mortality by 40%.
 1998. In November 1998, Immunex, a future acquisition of Amgen, received approval for Enbrel (etanercept), the first rheumatoid arthritis drug targeting tumor necrosis factor alpha (TNF-alpha). A 2006 assessment by the National Institute of Clinical Excellence of the United Kingdom concluded that etanercept and related rheumatoid arthritis drugs later introduced by competitors "are effective treatments compared with placebo for RA patients who are not well controlled by conventional DMARDs, improving control of symptoms, improving physical function, and slowing radiographic changes in joints." A more recent study demonstrated that compared to traditional disease-modifying anti-rheumatic drugs, treatment with etanercept improved survival, reduced cardiovascular events and reduced the incidence of hematological cancers.
 2010. On June 6, 2010 Amgen received FDA approval for Prolia, a protein drug for the treatment of post-menopausal osteoporosis. In clinical trials, Prolia reduced the rate of vertebral fractures by 61% and the risk of hip fractures by 40%.
 2010 In November 2010 the FDA approved Xgeva for the prevention of complications of bone metastases in patients with solid tumors. The clinical trials primarily enrolled patients with breast or prostate cancer.
 2012. Illegal marketing practices. The Los Angeles Times reported on December 18, 2012 that Amgen pleaded guilty and agreed to pay $150 million in criminal penalty and $612 million to resolve 11 related whistleblower complaints. Federal prosecutors accused the company of pursuing profits while putting patients at risk.  Larry Husten, a contributor at Forbes.com elaborates on AMGEN's illegal marketing practices in this case, namely that the "government accused Amgen of marketing Aranesp for indications not approved by the FDA and other illegal marketing practices". One of the drugs mentioned in the lawsuit had sales of $492 million in the third quarter of 2012, down 17% from the same quarter the previous year due to "reimbursement problems and label changes".
 2013. Lawmakers inserted text into the fiscal cliff bill that will allow the drugmaker to sell a class of drugs that includes Sensipar without government controls for an additional two years. The New York Times estimated that the paragraph in the fiscal cliff bill will cost taxpayers an estimated $500 million but other assessments concluded that the change would protect seniors in rural areas and reduce overall Medicare spending.
2015. In September the company announced it would acquire Dezima Pharma for more than $1.55 billion. The same day the company announced a collaboration with Xencor on 6 early stage immuno-oncology and inflammation programmes. As part of the deal Amgen will pay $45 million upfront, with the deal being worth up to another $1.7 billion.
2016. In September, the company announced it would purchase the rights to Boehringer Ingelheims Phase I bispecific T-cell engager compound (BI 836909, now AMG 420) for use in the treatment of multiple myeloma.
2017. Cash returned to shareholders totalled a record $6.5 billion through dividends and share repurchases.
2018. Amgen was ranked 123 on the Fortune 500 list of the largest United States corporations by revenue.
2019. Amgen announced it would acquire Nuevolution AB for 1.61 billion Swedish crowns ($166.8 million) to enhance its drug discovery capabilities. In August the company announced it would acquire the Otezla drug programme from Celgene for $13.4 billion, as part of Celgene and Bristol-Myers Squibbs merger deal. In October, Amgen announced it would be acquiring a 20.5% stake in the Beijing-based BeiGene for $2.7 billion. In November, Amgen awarded a $2 million grant to the CDC Foundation to launch the latter's EmPOWERED Health Program, promoting patient engagement in decision making for their cancer treatment.
2021. In March, the company announced it would acquire Five Prime Therapeutics and its lead candidate, bemarituzumab, for $1.9 billion and Rodeo Therapeutics for up to $720 million. In July, Amgen acquired Teneobio for $900 million.
2022. In August, the company agreed to acquire ChemoCentryx for $3.7 billion in an all-cash deal. ChemoCentryx is the maker of Tavneos—a drug treatment for rare diseases called anti-neutrophil cytoplasmic autoantibody-associated vasculitis—which was approved last year. In December, the company announced it would acquire Horizon Therapeutics for $27.8 billion ($116.50 in cash for each Horizon share, a 20% premium) expanding its rare disease treatments.

Acquisition history

Amgen (Founded 1983 as Applied Molecular Genetics)
Synergen Inc (Acq 1994)
Kinetix Pharmaceuticals Inc (Acq 2000)
Immunex Corporation (Acq 2002)
Tularik Inc (Acq 2004)
Abgenix Inc (Acq 2006)
Avidia Inc (Acq 2006)
Alantos Pharmaceuticals (Acq 2007)
Ilypsa Inc (Acq 2007)
BioVex Group Inc (Acq 2011)
Micromet Inc (Acq 2012)
Mustafa Nevzat İlaç (Acq 2012)
KAI Pharmaceuticals (Acq 2012)
deCODE genetics (Acq 2012)
Onyx Pharmaceuticals (Acq 2013)
NextCODE genetics (Spun off 2013)
Dezima Pharma (Acq 2015)
Catherex (Acq 2015)
Nuevolution AB (Acq 2019)
Otezla (Acq 2019)
Five Prime Therapeutics (Acq 2021)
Rodeo Therapeutics (Acq 2021)
Teneobio (Acq 2021)
ChemoCentryx (Acq 2022)
Horizon Therapeutics (Acq announced 2022)
Vidara Therapeutics International (Acq 2014)
Hyperion Therapeutics (Acq 2015)
Crealta Holdings  (Acq 2015)
Raptor Pharmaceutical  (Acq 2016)
River Vision Development Corp. (Acq 2017)
Viela Bio Inc  (Acq 2021)

Products 
Amgen's approved drugs or therapeutic biologicals include:

Aimovig (erenumab-aooe) for migraine headaches
Aranesp (darbepoetin alfa) for anemia
Blincyto (blinatumomab for the treatment of acute lymphoblastic leukemia)
Corlanor (ivabradine)
Enbrel (etanercept) for various forms of arthritis
Epogen (erythropoietin) for anemia
Evenity (romosozumab-aqqg) for osteoporosis
Imlygic (talimogene laherparepvec) for local treatment of unresectable cutaneous, subcutaneous, and nodal lesions in melanoma recurrent after initial surgery
Kyprolis (carfilzomib)
Lumakras (sotorasib)
Neulasta (pegfilgrastim) for neutropenia
Neupogen (granulocyte colony-stimulating factor) for neutropenia
Nplate (romiplostim) for chronic immune thrombocytopenic purpura
Parsabiv (etelcalcetide)
Prolia (denosumab) for postmenopausal osteoporosis
Repatha (evolocumab)
Sensipar/Mimpara (cinacalcet for primary and secondary hyperparathyroidism, a mineral metabolism complication common in patients with kidney failure)
Tezspire (tezepelumab) for asthma
Vectibix (panitumumab for colon cancer)
Xgeva (denosumab) for the prevention of skeletal-related events (pathological fracture, radiation to bone, spinal cord compression or surgery to bone in adults with bone metastases from solid tumors)

Products developed and then sold off
 Kepivance (palifermin for oral mucositis, sold to Biovitrium, now Swedish Orphan Biovitrum, in December 2008
StemGen (ancestim) for use in combination with filgrastim for mobilizing peripheral hematopoietic stem cells) (sold to Biovitrium, now Swedish Orphan Biovitrum, in December 2008)
Kineret (anakinra) for rheumatoid arthritis, exclusively licensed to Biovitrium, now Swedish Orphan Biovitrum, in December 2008

Pipeline and clinical trials
In December 2013, Amgen had 11 drugs in Phase III clinical trials. In November 2014 the company announced it was halting all trials of rilotumumab in advanced gastric cancer patients after one of the trials found more deaths in those who took the compound with chemotherapy, than those without. Later in the same week, the company in conjunction with AstraZeneca reported positive results for brodalumab in a Phase III trial comparing the compound with ustekinumab and a placebo in treating psoriasis.

In March 2015, the company announced it would license its Phase II candidate drug AMG 714 to developer Celimmune who plan to develop the anti-IL-15 monoclonal antibody for treatment against diet nonresponsive celiac disease and refractory celiac disease.

In June 2015, Amgen presented Phase II clinical trial data for their anti-CGRP antibody AMG 334 for migraine, approved for sale as Aimovig in 2019.

In September 2019, FDA granted fast track designation to sotorasib for the treatment of metastatic non-small-cell lung carcinoma (NSCLC) with the KRAS G12C mutation. In May 2021, sotorasib received accelerated approval from FDA for treatment of adult patients with NSCLC whose tumors have a KRAS G12C mutation and who have received at least one prior systemic therapy; this was the first approved targeted therapy for tumors with any KRAS mutation. Similar approvals for sotorasib in NSCLC followed in January 2022 in Europe and Japan.

In September 2022, data from a late-stage study showed the company's cancer pill Lumakras beating out chemotherapy. This was the first approved drug in the set of treatments that target KRAS, among the most common generic mutations found in cancers but one where researchers have struggled for years to design drugs to treat. The drug was approved in 2021 with a list price of $17,900 per month.

Carbon footprint
Amgen reported Total CO2e emissions (Direct + Indirect) for the twelve months ending 31 December 2020 at 243 Kt (-6 /-2.4% y-o-y) and aims to reach net zero emissions by 2027.

Public-private engagement 
Amgen engages with the public and private sectors in a variety of settings including to promote research and development, academic funding, event sponsorship, philanthropy, and political lobbying.

Academia 

 Institute for Advanced Study - Donor to various IAS campaigns, including the IAS/Park City Mathematics Institute (PCMI), the Regional Initiative in Science and Education (RISE), and the Opportunity Equation (OE).
 LA Promise Fund - Sponsor of the Amgen Biotech Experience Los Angeles (ABE-LA).
 University of Toronto - Donor to U of T's Boundless campaign.
 University of Washington - Donor.

Events and conferences 

 Alberta Kidney Days - Virtual series sponsor.
 BC Kidney Days - Sponsor.
 Mentoring in IBD - Sponsor.
 Princess Margaret Cancer Centre (PMCC) Conference - Sponsor.

Health care 

 Kingston General Hospital - Donor.
 Princess Margaret Cancer Centre - Donor to the Princess Margaret Cancer Foundation.
 Providence Health Care - Donor.
 Scarborough Health Network - Donor to the SHN Foundation.
 SickKids - Donor to the SickKids Foundation.
 Sinai Health System - Donor to the Sinai Health Foundation.
 St. Michael's Hospital - Donor.
 Sunnybrook Health Sciences Centre - Donor to the Sunnybrook Foundation.
 Unity Health Toronto - Donor.
 University Health Network - Donor to the UHN Foundation.
 Women's College Hospital - Donor.

Media 

 National Geographic Society - Donor.

Medical societies 

 American Society of Hematology - Corporate funder.
 Arthritis Society (Canada) - Partner.
 Canadian Society of Hospital Pharmacists - Donor to the CSHP Foundation.
 Canadian Society of Nephrology - Corporate partner.
 Endocrine Society - Corporate liaison board member.
 European Society of Cardiology - Sponsor for the EORP registry programme.
 Federation of Medical Women in Canada - Sponsor.

Political lobbying 

 Alliance for a Stronger FDA - Member.
 Alliance for Aging Research - Donor.
 BIOTECanada - Member.
 Bipartisan Policy Center - Donor.
 The Business Council - Member, represented by Amgen chairman and CEO Robert A. Bradway.
 CDC Foundation - Funding partner.
 Centre for Commercialization of Regenerative Medicine (CCRM) - Industry partner.
 Council on Foreign Relations - Affiliate.
 European Federation of Pharmaceutical Industries and Associations (EFPIA) - Member.
 Foundation for the National Institutes of Health (FNIH) - Donor.
 Global Health Progress - Partner. GHP is a multinational resource hub hosted by the International Federation of Pharmaceutical Manufacturers & Associations (IFPMA).
 Health Products Stewardship Association - Member.
 Innovative Medicines Canada - Member company.
 International Federation of Pharmaceutical Manufacturers & Associations (IFPMA) - Member.
 Life Sciences British Columbia - Sponsor.
 Mayor's Fund for Los Angeles - Disaster relief grant provider.
 National Health Council - Member.
 Personalized Medicine Coalition - Member.
 Pharmaceutical Advertising Advisory Board (PAAB) - Client. PAAB "maintains a collaborative relationship” with Health Canada.
 Pharmaceutical Research and Manufacturers of America (PhRMA) - Member.
 Reagan-Udall Foundation for the Food and Drug Administration - Donor.
 Research!America - Member.

Professional associations 

 British Columbia Pharmacy Association - Sponsor.
 Canadian Association of Gastroenterology - Corporate sponsor.
 Canadian Association of Radiologists - Corporate partner.
 Canadian Rheumatology Association - Corporate sponsor.
 Canadian Urological Association - Corporate sponsor.
 Colorectal Cancer Canada - Sponsor.
 Ontario Medical Association - Donor.

Research and development 

 Alberta Kidney Disease Network - Grant provider.
 Can-SOLVE CKD Network - Funding partner.
 Urban Institute - Donor.

See also 

 Kirin-Amgen v Hoechst Marion Roussel, a UK patent case decided by the House of Lords
 Amgen Inc. v. Harris, a United States Supreme Court case on employment law.
Evolocumab

References

External links

 

 
Biotechnology companies of the United States
Biopharmaceutical companies
Companies based in Thousand Oaks, California
Companies listed on the Nasdaq
Companies in the Dow Jones Industrial Average
Life sciences industry
Multinational companies headquartered in the United States
Orphan drug companies
Pharmaceutical companies established in 1980
Biotechnology companies established in 1980
Pharmaceutical companies of the United States
1980 establishments in California
1980s initial public offerings